Atlántico or Atlantico may refer to:
 Atlantico, a French news website
 The Atlantic Ocean, the second largest ocean in the world
 Atlántico Department in Colombia
 Banco Atlántico, a former Spanish bank, now part of the Banco Sabadell Group
in Nicaragua:
 South Caribbean Coast Autonomous Region, formerly the South Atlantic Coast Autonomous Region (Región Autónoma del Atlántico Sur)
 North Caribbean Coast Autonomous Region, formerly the North Atlantic Coast Autonomous Region (Región Autónoma del Atlántico Norte)
in Argentina:
Tierra del Fuego Province, Argentina (Provincia de Tierra del Fuego, Antártida e Islas del Atlántico Sur)
Islas del Atlántico Sur (department)
 Atlantico (album), a 2018 album by Marco Mengoni

Spanish language